Rhodotheratus is an extinct genus of captorhinid from the Early Permian Hennessey Formation of Oklahoma. The type species is R. parvus.

References 

Prehistoric reptile genera
Permian United States
Captorhinids
Fossil taxa described in 2021